Yuexiu Property Company Limited is a property developer located in Guangdong, China. Its major shareholder is Guangzhou Yuexiu Holdings Limited, the investment corporation of the Guangzhou Government in Hong Kong.

History
It is incorporated in Hong Kong and it was listed on the Hong Kong Stock Exchange as red chip stock in 1992.

The company was formerly known as Guangzhou Investment Company Limited and changed its name to Yuexiu Property Company Limited in 2009.

See also
Real estate in China

References

External links

Companies based in Guangzhou
Real estate companies established in 1992
Companies listed on the Hong Kong Stock Exchange
Companies listed on the Singapore Exchange
Government-owned companies of China
Real estate companies of China